SMS G197 was a S-138-class large torpedo boat of the Imperial German Navy. She was built by the Germaniawerft shipyard at Kiel between 1910 and 1911, and was launched on 23 June 1911, entering service later that year.

G197 served throughout the First World War, taking part in the Battle of Heligoland Bight in August 1914 and the Battle of the Gulf of Riga in August 1915. After the war, she was surrendered as a war reparation, and was scrapped in 1921.

Construction and design
The Imperial German Navy ordered 12 large torpedo boats (Große Torpedoboote) as part of the fiscal year 1910 shipbuilding programme, with one half-flotilla of six ships ordered from Germaniawerft and the other six ships from AG Vulcan. The two groups of torpedo boats were of basically similar layout but differed slightly in detailed design, with a gradual evolution of design and increase in displacement with each year's orders.

The ship was armed with two 8.8 cm L/45 guns, one on the forecastle and one aft. Four single 50 cm (19.7 in) torpedo tubes were fitted, with two on the ship's beam in the gap between the forecastle and the ship's bridge which were capable of firing straight ahead, one between the ship's two funnels, and one aft of the funnels. The ship had a crew of 84 officers and men.

G197 was laid down at Germaniawerft's Kiel shipyard as Yard number 157 and was launched on 23 June 1911 and completed on 10 November 1911.

Service
On commissioning, G197 joined the 1st Half Flotilla of the 1st Torpedo Boat Flotilla. G197 remained part of the 1st Half Flotilla through 1913 and into 1914.

First World War
G197 remained part of the 1st Half Flotilla of the 1st Torpedo Boat Flotilla on 10 August 1914. On 28 August 1914, the  British Harwich Force, supported by light cruisers and battlecruisers of the Grand Fleet, carried out  a raid towards Heligoland with the intention of destroying patrolling German torpedo boats. Four German light cruisers and another flotilla of modern torpedo boats (5th Torpedo Boat Flotilla) was in the vicinity of Heligoland. V197  formed part of the outer screen of torpedo boats. At about 06:00 on 28 August, another member of the outer screen reported spotting the periscope of a submarine. As a result, the 5th Torpedo Boat Flotilla was ordered out to hunt the hostile submarine. At 07:57 G194 was fired on by British warships, and was soon retreating towards Heligoland, pursued by four British destroyers. G197 managed to successfully avoid the British ships and returned to base. However, sister ship , leader of I Flotilla, ran into the midst of the Harwich force when trying to return to Heligoland and was sunk.

On the evening of 12 April 1915, the German airship L7 sighted a British light cruiser and five surfaced submarines in the Heligoland Bight. I Flotilla was ordered out to attack the submarines,  but G197,  and  collided in thick fog, disabling the three ships and causing the sortie to be aborted. In August 1915 the Germans detached a large portion of the High Seas Fleet for operations in the Gulf of Riga in support of the advance of German troops. It was planned to enter the Gulf via the Irben Strait, defeating any Russian naval forces and mining the entrance to Moon Sound. G197 took part in these operations, opening fire at what was believed to be a periscope of an enemy submarine when escorting the battlecruiser  on 10 August.

G197, still part of the 1st Torpedo Boat Flotilla, was part of the High Seas Fleet when it sailed to cover the Lowestoft Raid on 24–25 April 1916. She did not take part in the Battle of Jutland on 31 May–1 June 1916, with seven older torpedo boats of the 1st Torpedo Boat Flotilla being left behind. G197 remained part of the 1st Torpedo Boat Flotilla on 19 August 1916, when the High Seas Fleet sailed to cover a sortie of the battlecruisers of the 1st Scouting Group in the inconclusive Action of 19 August 1916.

G197 joined an escort flotilla in 1918 and on 22 February 1918, was renamed T197, in order to free her number for new construction, in this case the destroyer H197 which was ordered from Howaldswerke, but was cancelled at the end of the war. She remained a member of the 1st Half-flotilla of the 1st Escort Flotilla at the end of the war.

Disposal
After the end of the war, T197 initially remained under the control of the Weimar Republic's navy, the Reichsmarine, but after the scuttling of the German fleet at Scapa Flow on 21 June 1919, was surrendered under the terms of Treaty of Versailles to compensate for the scuttled ships. T197 was one of 20 German torpedo boats delivered to Cherbourg in France for consideration by France and Italy for incorporation into their navies, but was not wanted by either navy. The unwanted ships were to be scrapped by Britain, and T197 was sold on 22 October 1921 and was scrapped at Briton Ferry in Wales in 1921.

References

Bibliography

 

 

Torpedo boats of the Imperial German Navy
World War I torpedo boats of Germany
Ships built in Kiel